A Pistol Shot (Italian: Un colpo di pistola) is a 1942 Italian historical drama film directed by Renato Castellani and starring Assia Noris, Fosco Giachetti, and Antonio Centa. The film was shot at the Palatino Studios in Rome with sets designed by the art director Gino Brosio. It belongs to the movies of the calligrafismo style.

Synopsis
In Nineteenth century Russia, two men fight a duel over a woman.

Partial cast
 Assia Noris as  Mascia
Fosco Giachetti as  Andrea
Antonio Centa as  Sergio
Rubi Dalma as  zia di Mascia
Anna Capodaglio as la governante
Renato Cialente as  Gerardo De Valmont
Mimì Dugini as  Antonietta
Romolo Costa as Il Generale
Saro Urzì as Uno Dei Servitori Alla Scampagnata

References

Bibliography
 Gundle, Stephen. Mussolini's Dream Factory: Film Stardom in Fascist Italy. Berghahn Books, 2013.

External links

1942 films
Italian historical drama films
Italian black-and-white films
1940s historical drama films
1940s Italian-language films
Films directed by Renato Castellani
Films set in the 19th century
Films set in Russia
Films based on short fiction
Films based on works by Aleksandr Pushkin
Lux Film films
1942 drama films
Films shot at Palatino Studios
1940s Italian films